Herbert James "John" Leavey (5 November 1886 – 1954) was an English footballer who made 65 appearances in the Football League for Liverpool, Barnsley, Bradford Park Avenue and Portsmouth. He also played in 75 Southern League and Western League games for Plymouth Argyle. Leavey usually played in the outside forward positions.

After leaving Boscombe in 1922, he worked for Portsmouth as a scout, before moving to the Netherlands to manage PSV Eindhoven between 1922 and 1926. After his appointment as manager, PSV played in the 1e Klasse Zuid (the highest league for teams in South Netherlands) for three seasons. After finishing tenth in 1923 and sixth in 1924, PSV were relegated in Leavy's third season after finishing last. The 1925–26 season in the 2e Klasse B was won, which meant that PSV were promoted back to the 1e Klasse Zuid after one year. Leavy left PSV in 1926 after being four seasons in charge. He subsequently became manager of HRC of Den Helder, although he also started managing SV Gouda on a part-time basis later in the year. He moved to Gouda on a part-time basis in 1927 and led the club to the second tier title in 1931–32. He returned to HRC in 1935, remaining at the club until 1952.

Personal life 
Herbert was born in Guildford. He was married to May Pearson and had a son, James Herbert.

References

1886 births
1954 deaths
Sportspeople from Guildford
English footballers
Association football forwards
Plymouth Argyle F.C. players
Derby County F.C. players
Liverpool F.C. players
Barnsley F.C. players
Bradford (Park Avenue) A.F.C. players
Llanelli Town A.F.C. players
Portsmouth F.C. players
AFC Bournemouth players
Portsmouth F.C. non-playing staff
Southern Football League players
Western Football League players
English Football League players
English football managers
English expatriate football managers
PSV Eindhoven managers
Footballers from Surrey